Tatar was one of the five major tribal confederations (khanlig) in the Mongolian Plateau in the 12th century.

Name and origin

The name "Tatar" was first transliterated in the Book of Song as 大檀 Dàtán (MC: *daH-dan) and 檀檀 Tántán (MC: *dan-dan) as another name for the Rourans, who were of Proto-Mongolic Donghu ancestry. The Book of Song and Book of Liang connected Rourans to the earlier Xiongnu while the Book of Wei traced the Rouran's origins back to the Donghu. Xu proposed that "the main body of the Rouran were of Xiongnu origin" and Rourans' descendants, namely Da Shiwei (aka Tatars), contained Turkic-speaking Xiongnu elements to a great extent. Even so, the language of the Xiongnu is still unknown, and Chinese historians routinely ascribed Xiongnu origins to various nomadic groups, yet such ascriptions do not necessarily indicate the subjects' exact origins: for examples, Xiongnu ancestry was ascribed to Turkic-speaking Göktürks and Tiele as well as Para-Mongolic-speaking Kumo Xi and Khitans.

In historiography, the Proto-Mongolian Shiwei tribes are usually identified with Dada or Thirty Tatars, whereas the sources often refer to the actual Tatars as Nine Tatars, in which nine large clans are traditionally distinguished.

Ethnic and linguistic affiliations

The Toquz-Tatars and Otuz-Tatars were often proposed to be Mongolic speakers. In contrast, Soviet and Russian orientalist  argues that the Toquz Tatars and Otuz Tatars were instead Turkic-speaking, as the Persian-authored 10th century geographical treatise Hudud al-Alam stated that Tatars were part of the Toghuzghuz, whom Minorsky identified with the Qocho kingdom in eastern Tianshan, founded by Uyghur refugees following the collapse of the Uyghur Khaganate, whose founders belonged to the Toquz Oghuz confederation. At the same time, Kyzlasov is against the identification of the Tatars of the Orkhon inscriptions with Dada from Chinese sources.

Writing in the 11th century, Kara-Khanid scholar Mahmud al-Kashgari included Tatars among the Turkic peoples. He located the Tatars west of the Kyrgyzes.

When listing the 20 Turkic tribes, Kashgari also included non-Turks such as Kumo Xi, Khitans, Tanguts, and Chinese (the last one rendered as  < Karakhanid *Tawğaç). In the extant manuscript's text, the Tatars are located west of the Kyrgyzes; however, the manuscript's world-map shows that the Tatars were located west of the Ili river and west of the Bashkirs, whom Kashagari already located west of Tatars. Claus Schönig attributed such contradictions to errors made when the text and the map were copied. Kashgari additionally noted that Tatars were bilingual, speaking Turkic alongside their own languages; the same for the Yabaqus, Basmïls, and Chömüls. Yet available evidence suggested that the Yabaqus, Basmïls, and Chömüls were all Turkic speakers; therefore, Mehmet Fuat Köprülü concludes that in the 11th century, the Yabaqus, Basmïls, Chömüls, Qays and Tatars – the last two of whom Köprülü considers to be Turkified Mongols – could speak Kashgari's Karakhanid dialect as well as their own Turkic dialects, yet those peoples' own dialects differed from Karakhanid so substantially that Kashgari considered them other languages.

According to Klyashtorny, the name "Tatar" was the Turkic designation for Mongols. As Ushnitsky writes, the ethnonym "Tatar" was used by the Turks only to designate "strangers", that is, peoples who did not speak Turkic languages. The Turkic tribes living among their Mongol-speaking neighbors were also called "tat" or "tat-ar". According to Bartold, the peoples of Mongolian origin who spoke the Mongolian language had always called themselves Tatars. Subsequently, this word was completely supplanted by the word "Mongol".

History

The Rourans, Tatars' putative ancestors, roamed modern-day Mongolia in summer and crossed the Gobi desert southwards in winter in search of pastures. Rourans founded their Khaganate in the 5th century, around 402 CE. Among the Rourans' subjects were the Ashina tribe, who overthrew their Rouran overlords in 552 and annihilated the Rourans in 555. One branch of the dispersed Rourans migrated to the Greater Khingan mountain range where they renamed themselves after Tantan, a historical Khagan, and gradually incorporated themselves into the Shiwei tribal complex and emerged as 大室韋 Da (Great) Shiwei.

The Otuken region, constantly mentioned in the Orkhon inscriptions as the place of residence of the Turks, according to Mahmud Kashgar, was once in the country of the Tatars. According to Vasily Bartold, this message suggests that the Mongols already then reached the west to the area where their neighbors from different sides were Turkic tribes.

Persian historian Gardizi listed Tatars as one of seven founding tribes of the Turkic Kimek confederation. The Shine Usu inscription mentioned that the Toquz Tatars, in alliance with the Sekiz-Oghuz, unsuccessfully revolted against Uyghur Khagan Bayanchur, who was consolidating power between 744 and 750 CE. After being defeated three times, half of the Oghuz-Tatar rebels rejoined the Uyghurs, while the other half fled to an unknown people, who were identified as Khitans or Karluks. According to Senga and Klyashtorny, part of the Toquz-Tatar rebels fled westwards from the Uyghurs to the Irtysh river basin, where they later organized the Kipchaks and other tribal groupings (either already there or also newly arrived) into the Kimek tribal union. According to the Russian orientalist Vasily Ushnitsky, reports of medieval Muslim sources about the Tatar origin of the Kimak dynastic clan are the argument of the supporters of the Mongolian origin of the Kimaks and Kipchaks. The news about the Tatars, from whom the Kimaks separated, according to Josef Markwart, confirms the fact of the movement to the west of the Turkified Mongolian elements.

As for the division of Tatars who remained east, by the 10th century, they became subjects of the Khitan-led Liao dynasty. After the fall of the Liao, the Tatars experienced pressure from the Jurchen-led Jin dynasty and were urged to fight against the other Mongol tribes. The Tatars lived on the fertile pastures around Hulun Nuur and Buir Nuur and occupied a trade route to China proper in the 12th century. Southern Song ambassador Zhao Hong wrote in 1221 that in Genghis Khan's Mongol empire, there were three divisions based on their distance from the Jurchen Jin-ruled China: the White Tatars (白韃靼 Bai Dada), the Black Tatars (黑韃靼 Hei Dada), and the Wild Tatars (生韃靼 Sheng Dada), who were identified, by Kyzlasov, with the Turkic-speakers - including the Öngüds (of Turkic Shatuo origin), Mongolic speakers -to whom belonged Genghis Khan and his companions-, and the Tungusic speakers, respectively.

The Secret History of the Mongols claimed that the Tatars were mortal enemies of the Mongols: they betrayed Khamag Mongol's khan Ambaghai to be executed by the Jurchen Jin dynasty and also treacherously poisoned chief Yesukhei, father of Genghis Khan; consequently, in 1202, Genghis Khan allied with Ong Khan, conquered the Tatars, and had Tatar men taller than a linchpin executed, and spared only women and children. The surviving Tatars were absorbed into Genghis Khan's tribe, and the Tatar confederation ceased to exist. Since the Tatars were a tribe of thousands, their absorption greatly enlarged Genghis Khan's tribe.

Tatars and Mongols

Mongolian historian Urgunge Onon proposes that Mongols were initially known to Europeans as Tatars because Tatars were compelled to fight as vanguards before the main body of Mongol cavalry and the ethnonym Tatars would then be transferred to all Mongols. 

However, Bartold, Ushnitsky, Klyashtorny, Theobald, and Pow notice that even ethnic Mongols were often called Tatars, especially in unofficial sources either authored by foreigners (e.g. Turks, Chinese, Jurchens, Javanese) or by ethnic Mongols themselves (e.g. general Muqali or even Khan Ögedei). Pow proposes that the Mongolic-speaking tribes used the endonym Tatar during the first 30 to 40 years of the Mongol Empire's expansion, before self-identifying as Mongols, originally a dynastic-state label taken after the 12th-century Great Mongol State (大蒙古國); meanwhile, the old endonym Tatar fell out of favor and would be used to as a derogatory term for rebellious Mongolic-speaking tribes; Pow further speculates that the name-change was motivated by insecurities: either because the enemies held in contempt the name Tatar, or because the subjects used the endonym Tatar for Mongolic-speaking elites, or because rivalries among Genghis Khan's descendants necessitated the delineation of "in" and "out" groups.

Legacy

Turkic-speaking peoples of Cumania, as a sign of political allegiance, adopted the endonym of their Mongolic-speaking conquerors, before ultimately subsuming the latter culturally and linguistically.

Notes

References

History of Mongolia
Mongol peoples
Former confederations
Former monarchies